Suspended Animation, Inc (SA) is an American cryonics company founded in 2002 in Boynton Beach, FL. SA's purpose is to preserve bodies immediately after legal death to minimize the damages that occur before the body is cryogenically preserved.  SA does not actually perform final cryopreservation, rather, they work with companies such as Alcor Life Extension Foundation and Cryonics Institute which carry out the cryopreservations.  Unlike Alcor Life Extension Foundation and Cryonics Institute, Suspended Animation, Inc does not offer memberships, but rather gains revenue from performing the one-time procedure.

Coordination with Cryonics Organizations
Cryonics Institute (CI) offers coordination with Suspended Animation, Inc for patients outside of Michigan (CI's headquarters).  CI also expresses that it "neither endorses nor opposes the use of SA"  and urges members to make informed decisions regarding the use of Suspended Animation, Inc.

Alcor Life Extension Foundation also offers options for patients to use Suspended Animation, Inc in coordination with their procedures. Suspended Animation, Inc. provides all standby/stabilization/transport services for terminal Alcor Members outside Arizona, but inside the continental United States. Alcor provides those services for terminal Alcor Members in Canada, Arizona, and Hawaii.

In 2011, Suspended Animation hosted a weekend conference on Cryonics.

References

Cryonics organizations in the United States
Companies based in Palm Beach County, Florida
Boynton Beach, Florida
Medical and health organizations based in Florida